The black hornbill (Anthracoceros malayanus) is a species of bird of the hornbill family Bucerotidae. It lives in Asia in Brunei Darussalam, Indonesia, Malaysia, Singapore, Thailand.

The Black-casqued Hornbill has a selectiveness towards the environment and resources when it comes to reproduction. This organism will only start breeding and nesting when there is a large supply of fruits available, and in trees of larger size. When there are limited resources available, and may curtail nesting for years when there is a low availability of fruits(4). 
It is the major seed disperser for Durio graveolens, a species of durian.  The connection is strong enough to reflect in some of the common names for the fruit:  The Kenyah and Dayak peoples call it durian anggang (lit. 'hornbill durian'), and in Malay it is called / (lit. 'durian bird'),

Description 
The male has a yellowish bill while the female has a dark grey bill.

References

External links
 Downloadable Audio File of the call of the Malaysian black hornbill

black hornbill
Birds of Malesia
black hornbill